Arnošt or Arnost is a given name. Notable people with the name include:

Arnost, medieval Bishop of Rochester
Arnost Bellis (1882–1928), Czech writer, poet, journalist and translator
Inocenc Arnošt Bláha (1879–1960), prominent Czech sociologist and philosopher
Arnost Zvi Ehrman (1914–1976), Czech Jewish Orthodox rabbi
Arnošt Frischer (1887–1954), Czechoslovak Jewish politician
Arnošt Goldflam (born 1946), Czech playwright, writer, director, screenwriter, and actor
Arnošt Hájek (born 1941), Czech biathlete
Arnošt Hložek (1929–2013), Slovak football coach and player
Arnošt Klíma (1916–2000), historian of the Czech-speaking region
Arnošt Klimčík (born 1945), Czechoslovak handball player
Arnošt Königsgarten (1880–1942), Austrian businessman and fencer
Arnošt Kreuz (1912–1974), Czech football forward in the 1938 FIFA World Cup
Arnošt Lustig (1926–2011), Czech Jewish author of novels, short stories, plays and screenplays
Arnošt Muka (1854–1932), German and Sorbian writer, linguist and scientist
Arnošt Nejedlý (1883–1917), Czech long-distance runner
Arnošt Novák (1880–1939), Czech literary historian and critic
Arnošt of Pardubice (1297–1364), the first Archbishop of Prague
Arnošt Poisl (born 1939), Czech rower
Arnošt Konstantin Růžička (1761–1845), the second bishop of Budweis
Jan Arnošt Smoler (1816–1884), Sorbian philologist and writer
Arnošt Valenta (1912–1944), Czechoslovak Army officer, Royal Air Force Volunteer Reserve radio operator
Arnost Wiesner (1890–1971), modernist architect, one of the foremost interwar period architects of Brno